Live From The Stage Of The Roanoake Bluegrass Festival is a live album by the progressive bluegrass band Country Gentlemen, recorded in 1967.

Track listing
 Nine Pound Hammer
 Make Me A Pallet On The Floor
 Battle Hymn Of The Republic
 Lonesome Day
 Two Little Boys
 Copper Kettle
 Fields Have Turned Brown
 Bluebell
 Mule Skinner Blues
 Big Bruce

Personnel
 Charlie Waller - guitar, vocals
 John Duffey - mandolin, vocals
 Eddie Adcock - banjo, vocals
 Ed Ferris - bass, vocals

References

External links
 https://web.archive.org/web/20091215090142/http://www.lpdiscography.com/c/Cgentlemen/cgent.htm

The Country Gentlemen albums
1967 live albums
Albums produced by Charlie Waller (American musician)
Albums produced by Eddie Adcock